55 metres hurdles is a distance in hurdling, usually only run in indoor competitions. This is more commonly run at the high school level.  The objective is to approach the first hurdle with 7 steps, each hurdle after that needs to have 3 step intervals.  5 stepping or commonly known as stutter stepping cuts down a hurdlers momentum and cuts drastic time.  4 stepping is less common, but it is when a hurdler switches their lead leg each hurdle.  Unlike outdoor track and field, indoor track usually has no distance hurdles to also run since the typical indoor track is only 160 metres or 200 metres.   It is usually an alternative to the 60 metres hurdles.

All-time top 25
Note: Indoor results only.  Hand-timed marks excluded
 + = Timed recorded by athlete en route to a longer distance
 * = Converted from time for the slightly shorter distance of 60 yards by adding 0.01

Men
Correct as of March 2020.

Women
Correct as of March 2020.

Season's bests

Men

Women

Notes

References

Events in track and field
Hurdling
Indoor track and field
Sprint hurdles